Gavin Thomas Main (born 28 February 1995) is a Scottish cricketer. He made his first class debut for Durham County Cricket Club on 25 May 2014.

He made his Twenty20 International debut against Ireland on 19 June 2015, although no play was possible due to rain. He made his List A debut in the 2015–17 ICC World Cricket League Championship on 29 July 2015 against Nepal.

In May 2019, he was named in Scotland's One Day International (ODI) squad for their series against Afghanistan, but he did not play. The following month, he was selected to represent Scotland A in their tour to Ireland to play the Ireland Wolves. In July 2019, he was selected to play for the Edinburgh Rocks in the inaugural edition of the Euro T20 Slam cricket tournament. However, the following month the tournament was cancelled.

In July 2019, he was named in Scotland's One Day International (ODI) squad for the 2019 Scotland Tri-Nation Series. He made his ODI debut for Scotland, against Papua New Guinea, on 17 August 2019.

On 13 April 2022, in the fourth match of the 2022 Papua New Guinea Tri-Nation Series, Main took his first five-wicket haul in ODI cricket, with 5/52.

References

External links
 

1995 births
Living people
Scottish cricketers
Scotland One Day International cricketers
Scotland Twenty20 International cricketers
Durham cricketers
Sportspeople from Lanark